The poso bungu (Mugilogobius amadi) is a critically endangered (possibly extinct) species of fish in the family Gobiidae. It is endemic to Lake Poso in Sulawesi, Indonesia. Although sometimes placed in its own genus Weberogobius, recent authorities often include it in Mugilogobius.

References

Weberogobius
Freshwater fish of Indonesia
Fish described in 1913
Taxonomy articles created by Polbot